Kommersant (The Businessman or Commerce Man, often shortened to Ъ) is a nationally distributed daily newspaper published in Russia mostly devoted to politics and business. The TNS Media and NRS Russia certified July 2013 circulation of the daily was 120,000–130,000. It is owned by Alisher Usmanov.

History 
In 1989, with the onset of press freedom in Russia, Kommersant was founded under the ownership of businessman and publicist Vladimir Yakovlev. The first issue was released in January 1990. It was modeled after Western business journalism. 

The newspaper's title is spelled in Russian with a terminal hard sign (ъ) – a letter that is silent at the end of a word in modern Russian, and was thus largely abolished by the post-revolution Russian spelling reform, in reference to a pre-Soviet newspaper of the same name active between 1909 and 1917. This is played up in the Kommersant logo, which features a script hard sign at the end of somewhat more formal font. The newspaper also refers to itself or its redaction as "Ъ".

Founded as a weekly newspaper, it became popular among business and political elites. It then became a daily newspaper in 1992. It was owned by the businessman Boris Berezovsky from 1999 until 2006, when he sold it to Badri Patarkatsishvili. In September 2006, it was sold to Alisher Usmanov.

In January 2005, Kommersant published a protest at a court ruling ordering it to publish a denial of a story about a crisis at Alfa-Bank.

In 2008, BBC News named Kommersant one of Russia's leading liberal business broadsheets.

See also 

  a Russian news-radio station

References

External links

 Kommersant, English version online
 BBC news reporting on Kommersant's protest
 Photo gallery celebrating Kommersant's 15th anniversary
 Story in the St. Petersburg Times about the sale of Kommersant
"Kommersant"(1909–1917) digital archives in "Newspapers on the web and beyond", the digital resource of the National Library of Russia

Newspapers established in 1989
Russian-language newspapers published in Russia
Business newspapers
Mass media in Moscow